The 2016 Indy Lights season was a season of open wheel motor racing. It was the 31st season of the Indy Lights series and the 15th sanctioned by IndyCar, acting as the primary support series for the IndyCar Series.

Dubai born British sophomore driver Ed Jones won the championship by a narrow two point margin over rookie Uruguayan Santiago Urrutia. Jones won two races compared to Urrutia's four wins but Jones more consistently finished on the podium. American Kyle Kaiser won twice and made few mistakes and finished third in points. Kaiser finished just ahead of American Zach Veach whose season began poorly but won three of the last ten races. Dean Stoneman and Félix Serrallés also captured two wins, but were much less consistent and finished fifth and sixth in the championship respectively. Swede Felix Rosenqvist won three races but missed much of the season due to his role as a Mercedes factory driver in Europe.

Jones' Carlin team won the teams' championship and in the final race of the season, Jones' Carlin teammate Serrallés ceded fourth place to Jones on the final lap, allowing him to win the championship.

Team and driver chart
 All drivers compete in Cooper Tire–shod Dallara IL-15 chassis with Mazda AER engine.

Team Pelfrey purchased the assets of 8Star Motorsports

Schedule
The 2016 schedule was released on October 27, 2015. Phoenix and Road America returned to the calendar. Long Beach was removed from the schedule, and with the IndyCar Series not returning to the Milwaukee Mile, Indy Lights will not return either.

The Grand Prix of Boston was announced in late May 2015. The race was scheduled to be run on Labor Day Weekend on September 4, 2016. The proposed street circuit was based in the Boston Seaport District. On April 29, 2016, Boston newspapers reported that the race weekend, which was to include an Indy Lights support race, had been canceled. The race was replaced by a race at Watkins Glen International, on the same weekend.

The season will expand to 18 races, two more than the previous season. All races on road courses and street circuits will be double headers with the exception of Watkins Glen, which, like the oval tracks, will have only one race.

All races will be run in support of IndyCar races except the final weekend at Mazda Raceway Laguna Seca, which will be a Mazda Road to Indy headliner weekend.

Race results

Championship standings

Drivers' championship

Scoring system

 The driver who qualified on pole was awarded one additional point.
 An additional point was awarded to the driver who led the most laps in a race.
 The driver who obtained the fastest lap in a race was awarded one additional point.

 Ties in points broken by number of wins, or best finishes.

Teams' championship

See also
 2016 IndyCar Series season
 2016 Pro Mazda Championship season
 2016 U.S. F2000 National Championship

References

External links
 

Indy Lights seasons
Indy Lights
Indy Lights